{{DISPLAYTITLE:C13H26N2O4}}
The molecular formula C13H26N2O4 (molar mass: 274.36 g/mol, exact mass: 274.1893 u) may refer to:

 Adelmidrol
 Nisobamate
 Tybamate

Molecular formulas